Antônio Câmara (1937/8 – 25 August 2021) was a Brazilian politician who served as a Deputy at both state and federal levels.

References

1930s births
2021 deaths
Members of the Legislative Assembly of Rio Grande do Norte
Brazilian Democratic Movement politicians
People from Rio Grande do Norte